Seetha is a 1980 Indian Malayalam-language film,  directed by P. Govindan. The film stars Sukumari, Thikkurissy Sukumaran Nair, Nagavally R. S. Kurup and Ambika. The film has musical score by M. K. Arjunan.

Cast
Sukumari
Thikkurissy Sukumaran Nair
Nagavally R. S. Kurup
Ambika
Aranmula Ponnamma
Muralimohan
Sasi
Vidhubala
Sukumaran

Soundtrack
The music was composed by M. K. Arjunan and the lyrics were written by Sreekumaran Thampi.

References

External links
 

1980 films
1980s Malayalam-language films